Wilhelm Philipp (31 January 1916 – 10 January 1986) was a Luftwaffe ace and recipient of the Knight's Cross of the Iron Cross during World War II. The Knight's Cross of the Iron Cross was awarded to recognise extreme battlefield bravery or successful military leadership.  During his career Wilhelm Philipp was credited with 81 aerial victories in 500+ missions.

Career
Philipp was born on 31 January 1916 in Böhla, present-day part of Priestewitz, at the time in the Kingdom of Saxony, part of the German Empire.

World War II in Europe began on Friday 1 September 1939 when German forces invaded Poland. On 31 October 1939, Unteroffizier Philipp joined Jagdgeschwader 26 "Schlageter" (JG 26—26th Fighter Wing), which had been named after Albert Leo Schlageter on 1 May 1939. On 27 May 1940 during the Battle of Dunkirk, II. Gruppe reported combat with Royal Air Force (RAF) Supermarine Spitfire fighters over Ostend. This encounter is not matched with British records. However, the combat may have been with Hawker Hurricane fighters from No. 17 and No. 605 Squadron. That day at 17:30, Philipp claimed a Spitfire fighter shot down over Ostend.

On 7 June 1940, Philipp was forced to bail out of his Messerschmitt Bf 109 E-3 following combat with Hurricane fighters near Dieppe.

At the Channel and over England
On 17 August 1942, his Focke Wulf Fw 190 A-3 (Werknummer 5405—factory number) suffered engine fire resulting in an emergency landing at Ligescourt.

During the Dieppe Raid on 19 August, on II. Gruppes second combat air patrol of the day, at 08:37, Philipp was credited with the destruction of a Spitfire southwest of Dieppe, the aircraft coming from either the United States Army Air Forces (USAAF) 31st Fighter Group or the RAF No. 350 Squadron. At 17:32, a 4. Staffel Schwarm (flight) intercepted withdrawing Allied aircraft. In this encounter, Philipp claimed a Spitfire fighter west of Dieppe for his 20th aerial victory. For his achievements to date, Philipp was awarded the Honor Goblet of the Luftwaffe on 24 August.

In November 1942, Philipp was transferred to Jagdgeschwader 54 (JG 54—54th Fighter Wing) which was fighting on the Eastern Front.

War against the Soviet Union
Philipp claimed his first aerial victory on the Eastern Front on 15 January 1943. He had been assigned to 3. Staffel of JG 54 which at the time was commanded by Hauptmann Gerhard Koall. The Staffel was subordinated to I. Gruppe of JG 54 headed by Hauptmann Hans Philipp and was based at Krasnogvardeysk, present-day Gatchina. The Gruppe supported German forces of Army Group North fighting against the Soviet Operation Iskra which aimed to break the Wehrmacht's siege of Leningrad. On 15 January, Philipp was credited with shooting down a Lavochkin La-5 fighter.

On 22 February, his Fw 190 A-4 suffered engine failure resulting in a forced landing at Krasnogvardeysk. On 7 September, Philipp was wounded in combat when his Fw 190 A-6 (Werknummer 550501—factory number) was shot up by Yakovlev Yak-9 fighters resulting in an emergency landing.

Summary of career

Aerial victory claims
According to Spick, Philipp was credited with 81 aerial victories claimed in over 500 combat missions. Of his 81 aerial victories, 22 were claimed during the Battle of France and Battle of Britain, 55 on the Eastern Front, and four on the Western Front. Mathews and Foreman, authors of Luftwaffe Aces — Biographies and Victory Claims, researched the German Federal Archives and state that he claimed at least 79 claims. This figure includes 54 claims on the Eastern Front, and over 24 claims on the Western Front.

Victory claims were logged to a map-reference (PQ = Planquadrat), for example "PQ 10243". These sectors were then subdivided into 36 smaller units to give a location area 3 × 4 km in size.

Awards
 Honour Goblet of the Luftwaffe on 24 August 1942 as Oberfeldwebel and pilot
 German Cross in Gold on 27 October 1942 as Oberfeldwebel in the 4./Jagdgeschwader 26
 Knight's Cross of the Iron Cross on 26 March 1944 as Oberfeldwebel and pilot in the 3./Jagdgeschwader 54

Notes

References

Citations

Bibliography

External links
TracesOfWar.com

1916 births
1986 deaths
People from Meissen (district)
German World War II flying aces
Luftwaffe pilots
Recipients of the Gold German Cross
Recipients of the Knight's Cross of the Iron Cross
People from the Kingdom of Saxony
Military personnel from Saxony